SHC binding and spindle associated 1 like is a protein that in humans is encoded by the SHCBP1L gene.

Function

This gene encodes a Src homology 2 domain-binding protein 1-like protein. The encoded protein interacts with heat shock 70 kDa protein 2 and may be involved in maintaining spindle integrity during meiosis. This gene is located in region of chromoso0me 1 encompassing a prostate cancer susceptibility locus. [provided by RefSeq, Sep 2016].

References

Further reading